The 1935 Volta a Catalunya was the 17th edition of the Volta a Catalunya cycle race and was held from 1 June to 9 June 1935. The race started and finished in Barcelona. The race was won by Mariano Cañardo.

Route and stages

General classification

References

1935
Volta
1935 in Spanish road cycling
June 1935 sports events